Jorge Alfredo Alejandro Soria Macchiavello (born 3 March 1969) is a Chilean politician.

External links
BCN Profile

1969 births
Living people
Party for Democracy (Chile) politicians
Regionalist Action Party of Chile politicians
20th-century Chilean politicians
21st-century Chilean politicians
Members of the Chamber of Deputies of Chile
People from Iquique